Sterol regulatory element-binding protein 2 (SREBP-2) also known as sterol regulatory element binding transcription factor 2 (SREBF2) is a protein that in humans is encoded by the SREBF2 gene.

Function 

This gene encodes a ubiquitously expressed transcription factor that controls cholesterol homeostasis by stimulating transcription of sterol-regulated genes. The encoded protein contains a basic helix-loop-helix leucine zipper (bHLH-Zip) domain.
Various single nucleotide polymorphisms (SNPs) of the SREBF2 have been identified and some of them are found to be associated with higher risk of knee osteoarthritis.

Interactions 

SREBF2 has been shown to interact with INSIG1 and CREB-binding protein.

See also 
 Sterol regulatory element-binding protein

References

Further reading

External links 
 
 

Transcription factors